Social Politics: International Studies in Gender, State and Society is a peer-reviewed academic journal published by Oxford University Press. It was established in 1994 and is edited by Barbara Hobson, Ann Shola Orloff, and Rianne Mahon. It was previously edited by Fiona Williams.

Abstracting and indexing
Social Politics is abstracted and indexed in:

According to the Journal Citation Reports, the journal has a 2020 impact factor of 1.808.

See also 
 List of women's studies journals

References

External links 
 

English-language journals
Oxford University Press academic journals
Quarterly journals
Political science journals
Publications established in 1994
Women's studies journals